Loton Park Hill Climb is a hillclimb held in part of the Loton Park deer park just outside the village of Alberbury in Shropshire, England. The track was originally constructed by the members of The Severn Valley Motor Club based in Shrewsbury, in the mid-1950s. The first ever winner was Peter Foulkes in a Cooper Climax. The track was threatened with closure in 1969  and since then events have been organised by the Hagley & District Light Car Club, who obtained the lease on the land from owner Sir Michael Leighton in 1970, in which year the first National A hillclimb was staged.

The course is 1475 yards (1349 metres) in length, making it the third longest course used in the British Hill Climb Championship. It contains an unusual downhill section fairly early in its layout. The hill record of 41.76 seconds was set by Wallace Menzies on 26 September 2021.

Loton Park Hill Climb past winners

Key: R = Course Record; FTD = Fastest Time of the Day; S/C = Supercharged.

References

External links
 Loton Park Speed Hillclimb at Hagley & District Light Car Club website

Hillclimbs
Motorsport venues in England
Sports venues in Shropshire